Pucaparina (possibly from Aymara puka colored, Quechua puka red, Aymara parina flamingo, "colored flamingo" or "red flamingo") is a mountain in the Vilcanota mountain range in the Andes of Peru, about  high. It lies in the Puno Region, Melgar Province, Nuñoa District.

References

Mountains of Peru
Mountains of Puno Region